Šurjan is a village in Serbia. It is situated in the Sečanj municipality, in the Central Banat District, Vojvodina province. The population of the village is 330 (2002 census), including 145 Serbs (43.93%), 140 Hungarians (42.42%), and others.

Name
In Serbian the village is known as Šurjan (Шурјан), in Hungarian as Surján, in Romanian as Șurian, and in German as Schurjan.

Historical population

1869: 646
1900: 618
1921: 759
1931: 821
1948: 682
1953: 807
1961: 734
1971: 483
1981: 406
1991: 377

See also
List of places in Serbia
List of cities, towns and villages in Vojvodina

References
Slobodan Ćurčić, Broj stanovnika Vojvodine, Novi Sad, 1996.

Populated places in Serbian Banat
Populated places in Central Banat District
Sečanj